Conch Arena (Ulam HaKunchiya) is a multi-purpose sports arena that was built in Be'er Sheva, Israel, by the city council and National Lottery grant of Mifal HaPais. The arena is located in Be'er Sheva's Sports Quarter, on Etsel Street, adjacent to the Turner Stadium. The arena's capacity is 3,000 seats.

History
Conch Arena, opened its doors in December 2013, performances of the festival and 25 February 2014 he was inaugurated, by Rubik Danilovich, the mayor of Be'er Sheva, Shmuel Frenkel, chairman of BSL, and Isaac Larry, Chairman of Wiener ago the traditional All-Star game in the Premier League.

See also
 List of indoor arenas in Israel

References

External links
Conch Arena at kivunim

Sports venues in Beersheba